The Gilbert and Marshall Islands campaign were a series of battles fought from August 1942 through February 1944, in the Pacific theatre of World War II between the United States and Japan. They were the first steps of the drive across the central Pacific by the United States Pacific Fleet and Marine Corps. The purpose was to establish airfields and naval bases that would allow air and naval support for upcoming operations across the Central Pacific. Operation Galvanic and Operation Kourbash were the code names for the Gilberts campaign (in modern Kiribati) that included the seizures of Tarawa and Makin, during the Battle of Tarawa of 20–23 November and the Battle of Makin of 20–24 November 1943. Operation Flintlock and Operation Catchpole were aimed at capturing Japanese bases at Kwajalein, Eniwetok, and Majuro in the Marshall Islands.

Background
The Imperial Japanese Navy occupied the Gilbert Islands three days after the attack on Pearl Harbor, Hawaii. They built a seaplane base on Makin and dispersed troops along the coastlines of the northern atolls to monitor the Allied forces' movement in the South Pacific.

The Marshall Islands is located approximately 220 miles (350  km) northwest of the Gilbert Islands, and had been occupied by the Japanese since World War I as part of the South Seas Mandate. The Japanese regarded the islands as an important outpost for their navy.

Allied commanders knew that an eventual surrender of Japan would require penetration of these islands. While commander of the United States Army, General Douglas MacArthur, wanted to push towards the Philippines via New Guinea, United States Navy Admiral Chester W. Nimitz favored a drive across the central Pacific, through the Gilberts, the Marshalls, the Carolines, and eventually the Marianas, which would put American B-29 bombers within range of Tokyo. In addition to forcing the Japanese to fight two fronts against the Allies (Nimitz driving from the east and MacArthur from the south), Nimitz's plan would neutralize the outer Japanese defenses, allowing American ground, naval, and air bases to be stationed there for future attacks against other occupied island groups. These outer islands included the atolls of Tarawa and Makin in the Gilberts, and Majuro, Kwajalein, and Eniwetok in the Marshalls.

Gilberts

Prelude 
Japanese forces occupied the Gilbert islands on 9 December 1941, landing troops of the South Seas Detachment on Tarawa (10) and Makin islands (now Butaritari and Makin) (9), a few days after the attack on Pearl Harbor, in order to protect their south-eastern flank from allied counterattacks, and isolate Australia. The islands were to become a staging post for the planned invasion of the Ellice Islands by the Japanese, under the codename Operation FS, but their setback at the Battle of the Coral Sea delayed the plans, and their defeat at the Battle of Midway and later in the Solomon Islands put a definitive end to it.

Following Carlson's Raiders' diversionary Raid on Makin Island and the defeat at Guadalcanal, the Japanese command was growing aware of the vulnerability and strategic significance of the Gilbert Islands, and started adopting a defensive stance. Although Imperial leaders wanted to heavily fortify the Marianas and Palau before the Americans could get there, commanders in the outer islands were told to try and hold the island as long as possible. Fortifications were quickly improved by the Japanese, starting in March 1943. Makin Atoll had a seaplane base built on the main island of Butaritari, while Tarawa housed barely enough room for an airfield on its main harbour island, Betio.

Battle of Tarawa
When the Americans landed, in the Battle of Tarawa fought on 20–23 November 1943, nearly 5,000 Imperial Japanese Naval Landing Forces, among them 3,000 Special Naval Landing Forces and 1,247 construction laborers were stationed on Tarawa; the Makin Islands, in contrast, were only held by a total of 798 combat troops, including some 100 isolated Japanese aviation personnel. A detachment of soldiers from Tarawa island also occupied the island of Abemama in September 1942, and though initially numbering about 300, by the time the Americans invaded the island in November 1943, most of them had been evacuated back to Tarawa, leaving only 25 Special Naval Landing Forces behind to defend the island.

Lieutenant Junior Grade Seizo Ishikawa, the Japanese commander in charge of defending Makin, ordered his troops to build extensive fortifications on the island. These were designed to hold the island until reinforcements could arrive.

On Tarawa, Keiji Shibazaki had 4,836 troops, including around 2,600 Special Naval Landing Forces, 1,000 Japanese construction workers and 1,200 Korean laborers. He planned to use these units to primarily defend Betio, the largest island in the atoll. Betio was the site of a crucial Japanese airfield. To protect it from capture, Keiji had 14 coastal defense guns, 50 pieces of field artillery, 100 machine gun nests, and 500 pillboxes installed, as well as a large wall built across the northern lagoon.

Marshalls

Prelude 

After the Gilberts fell to the Americans in late November 1943, Admiral Mineichi Koga of the Japanese Combined Fleet was unsure of which islands the Americans would strike. Without any carrier aircraft to inform him, he ordered Admiral Masami Kobayashi to disperse his 28,000 troops primarily to the outer islands of Maloelap, Wotje, Jaliuit, and Mili. However, Allied intelligence intercepted Imperial code, informing the Americans of which islands were more heavily defended. The Americans decided to invade the least protected but strategically important islands of Majuro, Kwajalein, and Eniwetok.

As early as November, Consolidated B-24 Liberator from the Seventh Air Force stationed in the Ellice Islands had flown bombing missions over Mili and Maloelap. Four transports and fifty Japanese aircraft were lost, but the attack lacked strategic value. Fearing a counterattack from Wotje, Pownall ordered a second strike against the island. The Japanese did counterattack via a night bombing strike, in which Lexington sustained a torpedo hit but was not sunk. The task force later returned to Pearl Harbor. The Yorktown's aircraft would continue to fly air cover over the atoll on 29 January, 31 January, and from 1 February to 3 February.

The invasion of the Marshalls was delayed for about a month due to logistical problems. Japanese commander Rear Admiral Monzo Akiyama was aware that he lacked sufficient fortifications. He had 8,000 men, but only about half of them were soldiers; a large fraction of the rest were Korean laborers. To defend Kwajalein, Akiyama planned to use an aerial counterstrike with his 110 aircraft to weaken the American landing forces. However, on 29 January 1944, American carrier aircraft from carriers Yorktown, Lexington, and Cowpens destroyed 92 Japanese fighters and bombers. Akiyama now lacked the ability to effectively mount a successful counteroffensive.

Battle of Majuro
On 31 January 1944, Rear Admiral Harry W. Hill dispatched the Reconnaissance Company from the V Amphibious Corps of the Marines and the Army's 2nd Battalion, 106th Infantry, 27th Infantry Division to land on Majuro. This marked the beginning of Operation Flintlock, the invasion of Kwajalein. The island was seen as an important base for conducting air operations against the rest of the Marshall Islands and eventually the Marianas. The force took the lightly defended island in one day without any casualties.

Battle of Kwajalein

The same day as the Majuro invasion, the 4th Marine Division under Major General Harry Schmidt began their assault on Kwajalein.  Schmidt's troops first landed on Roi-Namur, a group of islands in the northern part of the atoll. Major confusion and delays were caused by poor weather and American troops inexperienced in amphibious operations, but the pre-invasion naval and air bombardment was extremely effective. Out of roughly 3,000 Japanese soldiers, only about 300 were left to guard the island.

On the southern island of Kwajalein, Major General Charles H. Corlett's 7th Infantry Division landed on southern Kwajalein with relative ease. Although the Japanese pillboxes, bunkers, and intense infantry offensives slowed the Americans, more troops, more experience in amphibious landings, effective pre-landing bombardment, and Japanese defenses on the opposite side of the atoll from where the Americans landed contributed to the capture of Kwajalein and its surrounding islands on 7 February. Of the entire force of about 8,000 Japanese guarding Majuro and Kwajalein, only 51 survived, and 253 were taken prisoner. The Americans suffered 348 men killed, 1,462 wounded, and 183 missing in the eight days it took to take the atoll.

Battle of Eniwetok 

Eniwetok's islands and islets housed enough room for airfields critical for the upcoming invasion of the Marianas. Major General Yoshimi Nishida knew that it would be extremely difficult to hold the main island of Eniwetok against the invasion. He had roughly 4,000 troops, half of them Army soldiers, while the rest were a variety of Navy sailors. Since the Americans would be landing with naval and air support, therefore giving them the upper hand, he decided to stop them at the beaches.

On 17 February 1944, a naval bombardment of Eniwetok Atoll began. This marked the beginning of Operation Catchpole. The same day, the 22nd Marine Regiment under Colonel John T. Walker landed on the northern island of Engebi. The landings were a logistical nightmare, with American troops, gear, and supplies scattered along the beach. Walker and his Marines took the island on 18 February with 85 dead and 166 wounded. On 19 February, the 106th Infantry Regiment, under Lieutenant General Thomas E. Watson, landed on the main island of Eniwetok after a heavy bombardment. However, the Japanese spider holes and bunkers repelled much of the bombardment by battleships. The landing group also faced the same logistical problems as the 22nd Marine Regiment. Japanese forces concentrated in the southwest corner of the island counterattacked the American flank, forcing the Americans to attack mainly at night. Eniwetok Island was captured on 21 February with the loss of 37 Americans and nearly 800 Japanese. On another one of Eniwetok's islands, Parry Island, the Americans used heavy gunfire support from battleships before the 22nd Marine Regiment, under Watson, waded ashore at Parry Island on 22 February. They captured the island and the entire atoll on 23 February. Of those engaged, 313 Americans died, 879 were wounded, and 77 were reported missing on Eniwetok, while the Japanese suffered 3,380 dead and 105 captured. This marked an end to the Marshall Islands campaign.

Aftermath 
In the Gilberts, the Americans emerged victorious, but were caught unprepared, suffering 2,459 dead and 2,286 wounded. Japan suffered a total of 5,085 dead and 247 captured. The heavy casualties and gruesome fighting conditions for both sides convinced General Holland Smith, commanding general of the V Amphibious Corps, that Tarawa should have been bypassed, although other American admirals disagreed.

The Marshalls, by contrast, were a much easier landing. The Americans used the lessons learned at Tarawa by outnumbering the enemy defenders nearly 6 to 1 with heavier firepower (including use of armor-piercing shells) after the islands took nearly a month of heavy air and naval bombardment. In the Marshalls, the Americans lost 611 men, suffered 2,341 wounded, and 260 missing, while the Japanese lost over 11,000 men and had 358 captured.

After the Gilberts and Marshalls were taken, the Allies built naval bases, fortifications, and airfields on the islands to prepare for an assault on the Marianas. The Japanese defeat forced military leaders to draw back to a new defensive perimeter, the Absolute National Defense Zone, which included the Marianas and Palau. These islands were heavily fortified for an upcoming assault because if captured, they would put American heavy bombers within range of Tokyo.

See also 

 Japanese occupation of the Gilbert Islands
 Mariana and Palau Islands campaign
 Marshalls–Gilberts raids
 Raid on Truk Lagoon

References

Further reading

 

1943 in the Marshall Islands
1944 in the Marshall Islands
1945 in the Marshall Islands
Articles containing video clips
Campaigns of World War II
Conflicts in 1943
Conflicts in 1944
Conflicts in 1945
Douglas MacArthur
Gilbert Islands
Kiribati in World War II
Marshall Islands in World War II
Pacific Ocean theatre of World War II